The National Dance Awards 2008, were organised and presented by The Critics' Circle, and were awarded to recognise excellence in professional dance in the United Kingdom.  The ceremony was held at the Sadler's Wells Theatre, London, on 26 January 2009, with awards given for productions staged in the previous year.

Awards Presented
Outstanding Achievement in Dance - Richard Alston, choreographer and founder Richard Alston Dance Company
Best Male Dancer - Edward Watson of The Royal Ballet
Best Female Dancer - Agnes Oaks of the English National Ballet
Best Choreography (Classical) - Christopher Wheeldon for Electric Counterpoint for The Royal Ballet
Best Choreography (Modern) - Hofesh Shechter, for In Your Rooms for his own company
Best Foreign Dance Company - New York City Ballet, from United States of America
Female Artist (Modern) - Kate Coyne
Male Artist (Modern) - Anh Ngoc Nguyen of Wayne McGregor Random Dance
Female Artist (Classical) - Yuhui Choe of The Royal Ballet
Male Artist (Classical) - Martin Harvey of The Royal Ballet
Outstanding Company - English National Ballet
Patron's Award - Northern Ballet Theatre
Working Title Billy Elliot Award - Michael Guihot-Jouffray
Industry Award - Janet Smith, Artistic Director of Scottish Dance Theatre

Special awards
No special awards were presented for the 2008 season.

References

National Dance Awards
Dance
Dance